Karen L. Soli (born July 15, 1948) is an American politician and a Democratic member of the South Dakota House of Representatives representing District 15 since January 11, 2013.

Education
Soli earned her BA from St. Olaf College and her M.Div. from Lutheran Theological Seminary.

Elections
2012 With District 15 incumbent Independent Representative Jenna Haggar redistricted to District 10, and incumbent Democratic Representative Mitch Fargen redistricted from District 8, Soli and incumbent Democratic Representative Patrick Kirschman ran in the three-way June 5, 2012 Democratic Primary, and placed first with 386 votes (36.4%); Soli and Representative Kirschman were unopposed for the November 6, 2012 General election, where Soli took the first seat with 3,026 votes (54.78%) and Representative Kirschman took the second seat.

References

External links
Official page at the South Dakota Legislature
 

Place of birth missing (living people)
Living people
Democratic Party members of the South Dakota House of Representatives
Politicians from Sioux Falls, South Dakota
St. Olaf College alumni
Women state legislators in South Dakota
1948 births
21st-century American politicians
21st-century American women politicians